= IFDA =

IFDA may refer to:

- International Foodservice Distributors Association
- Iranian Food & Drug Administration
- Irish Flying Disc Association, the Irish Ultimate frisbee league
- International Furnishings and Design Association
- International Foundation for Development Alternatives, a Swiss NGO from 1976 to the early 90s
- The associations for funeral directors in Illinois, Indiana, and Iowa.
